An antique shop is a retail store specializing in the selling of antiques.

Antique shop may also refer to:

 Mardot Antique Shop, a historic building in Ohio, United States
 The Antique Shop, a 2022 Thai-Singaporean horror movie